Why Won't You Date Me? is a comedy and relationship podcast hosted by Nicole Byer which debuted on December 1, 2017 on the HeadGum network. The podcast features Byer and a guest exploring why she is single, while discussing topics related to love, life, and sex. The podcast has been a part of the Team Coco network starting with the January 15, 2021 episode with Conan O'Brien.

Content
The format of an episode typically involves Byer introducing her guest/s, as they then talk about their respective experiences with sex, dating, relationships, and love. In most episodes, the guest will critique Byer's online dating profiles, before closing the episode by discussing whether or not they would date her - and why.

While the featured guest is often another comedian, Byer has also hosted former partners, as well as her own childhood friends. Notable guests who have appeared on Why Won't You Date Me? include Sasheer Zamata, Rachel Bloom, Jameela Jamil, Joel Kim Booster, Vicky Vox, and Trixie Mattel.

Reception
In 2018, Why Won't You Date Me? was labelled by The Daily Dot's John-Michael Bond as one of the 20 best podcasts on Spotify, with Bond regarding the podcast as "a cathartic romp through the hellscape of modern dating, led by a joyful host who never lets the darkness win."
Jillian Selzer of Insider described the podcast as "a hilarious chronicle of (Nicole Byer's) dating life as she connects her own struggles to the bigger issues within the dating world," further writing that "Byer's personality is loud, outgoing, and wildly entertaining," while Elite Dailys Annie Foskett recommended the podcast as a "must-listen," praising Byer's transparency about her dating life as being "extremely refreshing."

In 2019, Why Won't You Date Me? won Outstanding Foreign Series at the Canadian Podcasting Awards, which is "awarded to a breakthrough show – across any format and category – produced outside of Canada."

Becca James, writing for Vulture in 2019, called the show "one of the most forthcoming and funny podcasts around, and [the live episode with guest Vicky Vox] offers a perfect introduction by getting to the gist, which goes beyond the titular question and into the hilarious depths of human connection."

Zack Peter, writing for PopSugar, said, "Nicole Byer is a real treat! Her podcast takes you through her dating chronicles. If you're single, you'll love listening to Nicole every week. She's irreverent and has no filter. You'll find parts of yourself in her quest to find love."

Notable guests

Sasheer Zamata
Emily Heller
Jacob Wysocki
Matteo Lane
Brooks Wheelan
Mike Mitchell
Tess Holliday
Molly Tarlov
Eureka O'Hara
Zainab Johnson
Jon Gabrus
Nick Wiger
Sabrina Jalees
Marcella Arguello
Ego Nwodim
Jameela Jamil
Pandora Boxx
Baron Vaughn
Lisa Hanawalt
Joel Kim Booster
Elizabeth Ho
Chris Donaghue
Rachel Bloom
Trixie Mattel
Naomi Ekperigin
Grace Helbig
Jake and Amir
Dulcé Sloan
Punam Patel
Matt Rogers
Cameron Esposito
Miel Bredouw
Demi Adejuyigbe
Beth Stelling
Vicky Vox
Shangela
Alice Wetterlund
Johnny Pemberton
Jessica McKenna
DeRay Davis
Monique Heart
Ashley Nicole Black
Justin Simien
Ron Funches
Erika Lust
Fortune Feimster
Atsuko Okatsuka
Sam Pancake
Paul F. Tompkins
Laci Mosley
Echo Kellum
Willam Belli
Diona Reasonover
Michaela Watkins
John Milhiser
Whitney Cummings
Akilah Hughes
Kate Spencer
Eric Edelstein
Janelle James
Paul Rust
Megan Gailey
Ira Madison III
Jamie Loftus
Tawny Newsome
BenDeLaCreme
Michelle Buteau
Monét X Change
Jinkx Monsoon
Aja
Kirby Howell-Baptiste
Bob the Drag Queen
The Vixen
Jeffrey Bowyer-Chapman
Roxane Gay
Gabourey Sidibe
Amber Ruffin
Ziwe Fumudoh
Sam Jay
Dewayne Perkins
Latrice Royale
Yassir Lester
Sydnee Washington
Nichole Perkins
Mitra Jouhari
Patti Harrison
Priyanka
Langston Kerman
Jiggly Caliente
Roy Wood Jr.
Conan O'Brien
Deon Cole
Margaret Cho
Tiffany Haddish
Randy Jackson
Nore Davis
River Butcher
Alaska Thunderfuck
Bowen Yang
Hari Kondabolu
Marc Rebillet
Jillian Bell
Aparna Nancherla
J. B. Smoove
Casey Wilson
Jessica Rothe
Paul Scheer
London Hughes
Shea Couleé
Reggie Watts
Sam Richardson
Harvey Guillén
Yola
Laura Day
Maysoon Zayid
Lawrence Chaney
Laganja Estranja
Ms. Pat
Crystal Methyd
Meghan Trainor
Brittani Nichols
Rob Corddry
Raven-Symoné
Aida Rodriguez
Jimmy O. Yang
Naomi Smalls
D'Arcy Carden
Heidi N Closet
Nina West
Chelsea Peretti
Bianca Del Rio
Abbi Jacobson
Lamorne Morris
Gina Yashere
Shalita Grant
Moses Storm
Jackie Fabulous
Danielle Pinnock
Darcey Silva
Raven Goodwin
Lilly Singh
Donnell Rawlings
Stephanie Beatriz
Tika Sumpter
Drew Lynch
Judy Gold
Taylor Tomlinson
Raja Gemini
Kornbread "The Snack" Jeté
Penn Badgley
Willow Pill
Lil Rel Howery
Amy Aniobi
Nikki Glaser
Mae Martin
Sona Movsesian
Mary Holland
Guy Branum
Jujubee
John Stamos
Caleb Hearon
Aimee Carrero
Julie Klausner
Cole Escola
Larry Owens
Keke Palmer

References

External links 
 

Audio podcasts
Comedy and humor podcasts
2017 podcast debuts
Headgum
Interview podcasts
Advice podcasts
Works about interpersonal relationships
American podcasts